Nimesha Mendis (born 11 January 1996) is a Sri Lankan cricketer. He made his Twenty20 debut for Sri Lanka Air Force Sports Club in the 2017–18 SLC Twenty20 Tournament on 25 February 2018. He made his List A debut for Sri Lanka Air Force Sports Club in the 2018–19 Premier Limited Overs Tournament on 6 March 2019.

References

External links
 

1996 births
Living people
Sri Lankan cricketers
Sri Lanka Air Force Sports Club cricketers
Place of birth missing (living people)